Anthony Gilmore (3 December 1949 – 10 May 2018) was an Australian rules footballer who played with Geelong in the Victorian Football League (VFL).

Notes

External links 

1949 births
Australian rules footballers from Victoria (Australia)
Geelong Football Club players
2018 deaths